Zusi may refer to:

 Zushi, Kanagawa, a city in Japan
 Graham Zusi, American footballer
 Richard L. Zusi (born 1930), American ornithologist